Wonderful may refer to:

Albums 
 Wonderful (Adam Ant album), or the title song, 1995
 Wonderful (Circle Jerks album), or the title song, 1985
 Wonderful (Madness album), 1999
 Wonderful (Rick James album), or the title song, 1988

Songs 
 "Wonderful" (Angel song), 2012
 "Wonderful" (Annie Lennox song), 2004
 "Wonderful" (Beach Boys song), 1967
 "Wonderful" (Burna Boy song), 2020
 "Wonderful" (Erakah song), 2009
 "Wonderful" (Everclear song), 2000
 "Wonderful" (Gary Go song), 2009
 "Wonderful" (Iris song), 2011
 "Wonderful" (Ja Rule song), 2004
 "Wonderful" (Marques Houston song), 2007
 "Wonderful", by Aretha Franklin from So Damn Happy
 "Wonderful", by Chantal Kreviazuk from Ghost Stories
 "Wonderful", by India.Arie from Acoustic Soul
 "Wonderful", by Norman Bedard
 "Wonderful", by Ringo Starr from Ringo 2012
 "Wonderful", by Seven Nations from And Now It's Come to This
 "Wonderful", by Stone Temple Pilots from Shangri-La Dee Da
 "Wonderful", by Travis Scott from Birds in the Trap Sing McKnight
 "Wonderful", from the stage musical Wicked

Other uses 
 Wonderful (band), an American pop band
 Wonderful, a ballet by Maurice Hines performed by BalletMet during the 2009–10 season
 Wonderful, the official fan club of the group Wonder Girls
 "Wonder-ful", an episode of the television series Glee
 "Wonder Full", a multimedia show at Marina Bay Sands, Singapore
 Wonderful!, an enthusiast podcast created by Rachel and Griffin McElroy

See also 
 "Wonderful! Wonderful!", a 1957 song popularized by Johnny Mathis
 'S Wonderful, a song composed by George Gershwin, with lyrics written by Ira Gershwin
 So Wonderful, a song by Ladies' Code